Sino-Seychellois are overseas Chinese who reside in Seychelles. In 1999, their population was estimated at 1,000 individuals, making them one of Africa's smaller Chinese communities.

History
The first Chinese immigrants to Seychelles arrived 
from Mauritius in 1886. Until around 1940, it was common for a Sino-Mauritian to bring his relatives over from China to Mauritius for a period of apprenticeship in his business; after they had gained sufficient familiarity with commercial practises and life in a colonial society, he would send them onwards with letters of introduction, lending them his own capital to start up businesses in neighbouring regions, including Seychelles.

Like in other overseas Chinese communities, rivalry between Cantonese- and Hakka-speakers was a common feature of their social life. The two separate groups lived in different areas and even refused to marry each other, instead preferring to marry local women of African descent. They started out working on vanilla plantations, but quickly turned to shopkeeping, transport, and fishing.

Language, education, and culture
In 1945, Richard Man-Cham, the father of future Prime Minister James Mancham, requested government permission to open a Chinese school. The government responded coldly to the idea. Formal Chinese language education would not be established in Seychelles until 2007, when the People's Republic of China sent a teacher to work with the adult and distance education department of Seychelles' Ministry of Education. Today, most Sino-Seychellois do not speak Chinese, though they may understand it.

Sino-Seychellois are largely Christian. There are only two Buddhist pagodas in the Seychelles, both on Mahé.

Notable individuals
Sir James Mancham, descendant of a Chinese immigrant grandfather
Anglican Archbishop French Chang-Him, descendant of a Chinese father
Li Huarong, Deputy Minister

References

Notes

Sources

Further reading

Asian diaspora in Seychelles
Seychelles